Catch a Rising Star may refer to:

 Catch a Rising Star (comedy clubs), a chain of comedy clubs
 Catch a Rising Star (TV series), a Canadian variety television series
 Catch a Rising Star (album), a 1963 album by John Gary